Rudkhaneh District is a district (bakhsh) in Rudan County, Hormozgan Province, Iran. At the 2006 census, its population was 17,620, in 3,816 families.  The District has one city: Ziarat-e Ali.  The District has three rural districts (dehestan): Mosaferabad Rural District, Rudkhaneh Rural District, and Rudkhaneh Bar Rural District.

References 

Districts of Hormozgan Province
Rudan County